Matthew Berlin (born January 20, 1998) is a Canadian amateur ice hockey player. He appeared in one game for the Edmonton Oilers of the National Hockey League (NHL) in the 2022–23 season as an emergency goaltender who was put in a game against the Chicago Blackhawks on January 28, 2023 with 2:26 remaining in the game.

Playing career
Berlin was drafted 148th overall by the Spokane Chiefs in the fifth round of the 2013 WHL Bantam Draft. In January 2016, he was reassigned to the Drayton Valley Thunder of the Alberta Junior Hockey League (AJHL) for the remainder of the 2015–16 season. The Chiefs traded Berlin to the Seattle Thunderbirds in October 2016, where he spent two seasons and amassed a 19–9–4–1 record. Berlin was traded to the Kootenay Ice in January 2018.

In the 2018–19 season, Berlin played as a starter for the AJHL Sherwood Park Crusaders, who had first acquired him from the Drayton Valley Thunder in 2016. After finishing the season with 28 wins in 38 games, he signed with the University of Alberta Golden Bears for the 2019–20 season.

Berlin was an emergency backup goalie for the Colorado Avalanche on April 22, 2022, against the Edmonton Oilers. On January 28, 2023, the Edmonton Oilers signed him to an ATO on an emergency basis, after regular goaltender Stuart Skinner was pulled from the lineup before game time due to illness. Berlin served as the backup to Jack Campbell and entered the game for the final 2 minutes in the Oilers' 7-3 win over the Chicago Blackhawks, saving his lone shot faced.

Career statistics

Regular season and playoffs

See also
Emergency backup goaltender
List of players who played only one game in the NHL

References

External links

1997 births
Living people
Alberta Golden Bears ice hockey players
Canadian ice hockey goaltenders
Drayton Valley Thunder players
Edmonton Oilers players
Kootenay Ice players
Seattle Thunderbirds players
Sherwood Park Crusaders players
Spokane Chiefs players
Ice hockey people from Edmonton
Undrafted National Hockey League players